The following lists events that happened during 2014 in Bahrain.

Incumbents
 Monarch: Hamad ibn Isa Al Khalifa
 Prime Minister: Khalifa bin Salman Al Khalifa

Events

November
 November 22 - Voters in Bahrain go to the polls for the first parliamentary elections since the unsuccessful Pearl Revolution.

December
 December 20 - A bomb detonates in Bani Jamra, injuring 3 police officers.

References

 
2010s in Bahrain
Years of the 21st century in Bahrain
Bahrain
Bahrain